Acianthera spilantha is a species of orchid.

spilantha